(February 26, 1920 – April 6, 2008), also known as Yasunori Kawauchi, was a Japanese screenwriter who created various tokusatsu series, including the first, Moonlight Mask, in 1958. He was originally from Hakodate, Hokkaido.
His series Warrior of Love Rainbowman (1972) is considered to be an inspiration for Go Nagai's Cutie Honey. Other tokusatsu shows he created include Seven Color Mask (1959) and Messenger of Allah (1960).

Personal life 
Kawauchi converted to Islam in 1959. This led to his creation of the tokusatsu superhero series Messenger of Allah in 1960.

Filmography

Created 

 Warrior of Love Rainbowman (1972)
 Seven Color Mask (1959)
 Messenger of Allah (1960)

Writer 

 Ramayana (1943) - first work

References

1920 births
2008 deaths
20th-century Japanese musicians
Conservatism in Japan
Converts to Islam
Japanese lyricists
Japanese Muslims
People from Hakodate
Writers from Hokkaido
20th-century Japanese screenwriters